Colors Infinity  is an Indian pay television channel owned by Viacom18. It primarily airs popular shows from the United States and the United Kingdom along with a few original shows to appeal to the English-speaking population of India and a few other South Asian countries. The channel was co-curated by Karan Johar and Alia Bhatt.

Original Programming
Along with airing syndicated TV series, it also started producing its own original series. Till date it has produced four original series.   
 
 The Stage is the first ever home grown English language singing show and premiered on 10 October 2015. The show provided a platform to 20 raw talent from around the country in a quest to find India's best English language singer. Season 1 was hosted by Shibani Dandekar and was judged by Vishal Dadlani, Monica Dogra, Ehsaan Noorani, and Devraj Sanyal. The winner of first season was Yatharth Ratnum. Season 2 of The Stage premiered on 17 September 2016. British boy band The Vamps guest starred in one of the episodes this season. 
 Born Stylish was the homegrown celebrity talk show dedicated to fashion and style was premiered on Saturday, 28 November 2015 at 8:30 PM on Colors Infinity and Vh1 simultaneously. Bollywood style icons like Akshay Kumar, Sonakshi Sinha and Anil Kapoor appeared on the show and spilled the beans on their evolution of style through the years. Additionally, international fashion pioneers like Jean Paul Gaultier, Anna Zegna of the Ermenegildo Zegna family, Massimiliano Giornetti of Salvatore Ferragamo and more were also seen. It was hosted by ace designer Pria Kataaria Puri. They have also produced a one-episode special show called Journeys of a Lifetime.
 Journeys of a Lifetime was a special one-hour show highlighting the journeys of a few travelers. It was aired on 27 December 2015 at 8 PM. The show featured the life changing journeys of Fatima Bhutto, Homi Adajania, Chandrahas Choudhury, Kesri Khambatta and Veda Hrudya Nadendla who set their life to explore and dream. From a deep sea dive to explore a wrecked ship or even a pursuit of a daughter to fulfil her dying father's wish, everything was recorded and aesthetically captured in the show.
 Vogue BFFs is a new-format talk show, where a Bollywood celeb is joined by his/her lesser known BFF (Best Friend Forever), was premiered on Saturday, 24 September 2016 at 9 PM on Colors Infinity. The show host Kamal Sidhu facilitates a candid light-hearted chat with the two guests about their story and life. Besides the talk, the show also features some fun games with the guests.
 Top Model India is the English language modeling show that premiered on 4 February 2018. The show provided a platform to raw model from around the country in to become India's Top Model. The show is hosted by Lisa Haydon.

Current Programming

All American
America's Got Talent
Animal Kingdom
Arsenal World
The Bachelor
The Bachelorette
Bachelor in Paradise
Batwoman
Beat Shazam
Better Call Saul
Black Lightning 
Britain's Got Talent
Britain's Got Talent: The Champions
The Capture
Chicago Fire
The Flash
The Good Doctor
The Last Kingdom
Law & Order: Special Victims Unit
Legacies
Legends of Tomorrow
Love Island USA
Manifest
My Kitchen Rules
New Amsterdam 
Peaky Blinders 
Prodigal Son 
Riverdale
Shark Tank
S.W.A.T
Top Gear
Younger

Former Programming

Comedy-Drama
The Big C
Fargo 
Girlfriends' Guide to Divorce
God Friended Me
Imposters 
Katy Keene
Life Sentence
Mozart in the Jungle
Utopia

Drama
12 Monkeys
Absentia
Allegiance
American Odyssey 
Arrow
The Art of More
Atlantis
Bates Motel
The Blacklist: Redemption
Black Mirror
Blindspot
Broadchurch
Chasing Life
Chicago Med
Chicago P.D.
Constantine
Continuum
Covert Affairs
Damages
Deception 
Emerald City
Forever
Frequency
Game of Silence
The Good Karma Hospital
Gossip Girl
Grimm 
Heartbeat 
Heroes
Heroes Reborn
The Honourable Woman
Houdini & Doyle
Humans
iZombie
Kingdom
The Last Ship
Legends
Lucifer
Mad Dogs
The Magician
Manhattan
Mr. Robot
The Musketeers
Nashville 
The Night Shift 
Notorious
Orange Is the New Black
Pearson
The Player
Powers
Pretty Little Liars
Pretty Little Liars: The Perfectionists
Pure Genius
The Red Line
Reverie
The Royals 
Salem
Satisfaction
Shades of Blue
Snatch
Southland
State of Affairs
Suits
Taken 
Timeless
Troy
Tyrant
The Village

Reality
America's Got Talent: The Champions
America's Next Top Model
The Bachelor Winter Games
Born Stylish
The Great British Bake Off
Junior Bake Off
So You Think You Can Dance
The Stage
Strictly Come Dancing

Sitcoms
2 Broke Girls
American Woman
The Big Bang Theory
Living Biblically
Mike & Molly
Schitt's Creek
Two and a Half Men

Science Fiction

References

Television stations in Mumbai
English-language television shows
Television channels and stations established in 2015
English-language television stations in India
Television stations in New Delhi
Viacom 18
2015 establishments in Maharashtra